István Ilku (6 March 1933 – 17 April 2005) was a Hungarian football goalkeeper who played for Hungary in the 1958 and 1962 FIFA World Cups. He also played for Dorogi FC.

References

External links
 FIFA profile

1933 births
2005 deaths
Footballers from Budapest
Hungarian footballers
Hungary international footballers
Association football goalkeepers
1958 FIFA World Cup players
1962 FIFA World Cup players
20th-century Hungarian people